The 1977–78 season was the fifth season of the Takht Jamshid Cup of Iranian football. The competition was won by PAS Football Club of Tehran.

Results

Top goalscorers

References
Pars sport

Takht Jamshid Cup
Iran
1977–78 in Iranian football